The seventh season of the Russian reality talent show The Voice Kids premiered on February 14, 2020 on Channel One. Dmitry Nagiev returned as the show's presenter. Valery Meladze returned as a coach, Basta returned as a coach after a one-season break and replaced Pelageya, Polina Gagarina replaced LOBODA and became a new coach for the show. Olesya Kazachenko was announced the winner on April 24, 2020, marking Basta's first win as a coach.

Coaches and presenters

There were two changes to the coaching panel. Valery Meladze was joined by Polina Gagarina as a new coach and Basta, who returned after a one-season break.

Dmitry Nagiev as presenter is joined by Agata Muceniece, who already held this position in the fifth season.

Teams
Colour key

Blind auditions
Colour key

The coaches performed "О голос" at the start of the show.

The Battles
The Battles start on March 27, 2020. Contestants who won their battle advanced to the Sing-off rounds.
Colour key

The Sing-offs
The Sing-offs start on March 27. Contestants who was saved by their coaches advanced to the Final.
Colour key

Live shows
Colour key

Week 1: Live Playoffs (April 17)
As with season 2, each coach saved three artists who were eliminated in the Sing-offs.
Playoff results were voted on in real time. Nine artists sang live and six of them were eliminated by the end of the night.
Three saved artists advanced to the Final.

The show was live with no audience due to the 2019–20 coronavirus pandemic.

Week 2: Final (April 24)

Best Coach
Colour key

Reception

Rating

Notes

References

7
2020 Russian television seasons